Arrival(s) or The Arrival(s) may refer to:

Film
 The Arrival (1991 film), an American science fiction horror film
 The Arrival (1996 film), an American-Mexican science fiction horror film
 Arrival (film), a 2016 American science fiction film by Denis Villeneuve

Literature
 Arrival (novel), 2009, by Chris Morphew
 Arrival (story collection) or Stories of Your Life and Others, 2016, by Ted Chiang
 The Arrival (graphic novel), 2006, by Shaun Tan
 The Arrival (novel), a 2000 Animorphs novel by K.A. Applegate
 The Arrivals, a 2013 novel by Melissa Marr

Music
 Arrival (band), a British close-harmony pop-rock band with two eponymous albums

Albums
 Arrival (ABBA album) or the title instrumental (see below), 1976
 Arrival (Cymande album), 1981
 Arrival (Horace Parlan album) or the title instrumental, 1974
 Arrival (Jordan Rudess album), 1988
 Arrival (Journey album), 2000
 Arrival (Rosie Gaines album) or the title song, 1997
 Arrival (EP), or Jianglin, by Top Combine, or the title song, 2008
 The Arrival (album), by Hypocrisy, 2004 
 The Arrival (EP), by Bliss n Eso, 2000
 The Arrival, by Magic Kingdom, 1999

Songs
 "Arrival" (composition), by ABBA, 1976
 "Arrival", by Daft Punk from the Tron: Legacy film soundtrack, 2010
 "Arrivals", by Silverstein from This Is How the Wind Shifts, 2013

Television episodes
 "Arrival" (The Prisoner), 1967
 "Arrival" (Smallville), 2005
 "Arrivals" (The White Lotus), 2021
 "The Arrival" (Fringe), 2008
 "The Arrival" (The Jeffersons), 1980
 "The Arrival" (The Twilight Zone), 1961
 "The Arrival" (The Vicar of Dibley), 1994

Video games
 The Arrival (video game), a 1997 adventure game
 Mass Effect 2: Arrival, 2010
 Slender: The Arrival, 2013

Other uses
 Arrival (company), a British electric vehicle manufacturer
 The Arrival (installation), a 2013 art installation in Indianapolis, Indiana, US
 Arrival Heights, Ross Island, Antarctica
 NXT Arrival, a 2014 wrestling event

See also

Arrive (disambiguation)
Arriving (disambiguation)